Accentus is a French chamber choir founded by Laurence Equilbey in 1991. The ensemble has been in residence at the Opéra de Rouen since 1998. When in Rouen, the choir usually holds concerts at the Théâtre des Arts or the recently reopened Chapelle Corneille

History

Founded in 1991, the ensemble received the support of the Fondation France Telecom in 1993. Performing mostly contemporary compositions, the choir has collaborated with conductor Eric Ericson since 1996, and has been in résidence at the Rouen Opera House since 1998. Following the world success of Pascal Dusapin's creations Granum sinapis (1998) and Dona eis (1998) and the French creation Outis (1999) by Luciano Berio, Accentus went on a world tour accompanied by the Ensemble InterContemporain founded by Pierre Boulez, which took them to different countries including the United States.

Repertoire

Founded by Laurence Equilbey, the choir is made up of 32 singers, all professionals. The scope of the ensemble ranges from the 17th century compositions to contemporary creations.

The choir also accompanies large symphonic orchestras, under the direction of Pierre Boulez, Jonathan Nott and Christoph Eschenbach, as well as the Orchestre de Paris, the Ensemble InterContemporain and the Rouen Philharmonic Orchestra. The ensemble also takes part in lyrical concerts.

Discography

 1994 : Poulenc, Ravel - Chœurs profanes / Secular Choral Works
 1997 : Poulenc
 1998 : Mendelssohn - Psalms & Motets - Hora Est
 1998 : Schubert
 2000 : Antigona (Decca)
 2000 : North
 2000 : Pascal Dusapin - Requiem(s)
 2001 : Brahms - Schumann - Chœurs profanes
 2001 : Poulenc - Figure humaine
 2002 : Suomi
 2003 : Transcriptions 
 2004 : Brahms - Ein Deutsches Requiem
 2005 : Mozart - Mass
 2005 : Schoenberg
 2006 : Brahms - Schumann - A Capella choruses
 2006 : Haydn - Seven Last Words
 2006 : Transcriptions 2
 2006 : Un soir de neige
 2007 : Liszt - Via crucis
 2008 : Dvorak - Stabat Mater
 2008 : Faure - Requiem
 2009 : Strauss - A cappella
 2010 : Nuit sacrée: 1. Canon in D major – Johann Pachelbel; 2. Choral ‘Jesus bleibet meine Freude’ - J. S. Bach; 3. Jauchzet, frohlocket! – J. S. Bach; 4. Ave Maria – Charles Gounod / J. S. Bach; 5. Alleluia – Dietrich Buxtehude; 6. For unto us a child is born (Messiah) – G. F. Handel; 7. Alleluia (Messiah) – G. F. Handel; 8. Benedictus (Oratorio de Noël) – Camille Saint-Saëns; 9. Panis Angelicus, César Franck; 10. Alleluia (Exsultate, jubilate) – W. A. Mozart; 11. Farandole (L’Arlésienne) – Georges Bizet; 12. Minuit, chrétiens! – Adolphe Adam; 13. Trois anges sont venus ce soir – Agusta Holmès; 14. Stille Nacht! Heilige Nacht! – F. X Gruber.
 2010 : Rachmaninoff - Liturgie de saint Jean Chryostome - Vêpres
 2011 : Mendelssohn - Christus
 2011 : Philippe Manoury - Inharmonies
 2013 : Brahms - Ein Deutsches Requiem (Réédition)
 2013 : Janacek - Brumes d'enfance
 2014 : Mozart - Requiem
 2015 : Félicien David - Le Désert

References

External links
 homepage

Choir|Chamber choir
Musical groups from Normandy